Vasiliy Vladimirovich Berezutski (born 20 June 1982) is a Russian football coach and a former player who played as a defender. He began his professional career in 1999 at the age of 17 with Torpedo Moscow, having graduated from their famed academy. He was a Russia national football team regular, earning his 100th cap on 6 September 2016 in a friendly against Ghana. He played as a fullback or centre-back and sometimes was also deployed as wingback or midfielder.

Vasili started to play football in sport school Smena in Moscow before going to Torpedo. His identical twin brother, Aleksei, also came through the Torpedo academy with him and played as a defender for CSKA Moscow.

He officially announced his retirement from playing on 21 July 2018.

International career
Vasili scored his first goal for Russia during a Euro 2008 Qualification match against Macedonia.

He was called up to Russia's Euro 2008 squad and came on as a late substitute in their second game against Greece in Salzburg and started the semi-final against Spain in Vienna.

He was named in Russia's provisional squad for UEFA Euro 2012, but had to drop out before the tournament began due to a thigh injury.

On 2 June 2014, he was included in the Russia's 2014 FIFA World Cup squad, and appointed as the team captain. He was chosen in Russia's squad for Euro 2016 and scored an injury time equaliser in Russia's opening game against England.

On 7 March 2018, he officially retired from international football.

Coaching career
On 3 January 2019, Vasili and his twin brother Aleksei joined Dutch club Vitesse as assistant coaches to Leonid Slutsky, who trained them with CSKA and national team. In August 2020 he returned to CSKA Moscow as assistant to Viktor Goncharenko, where he was joined by Aleksei once again in February 2021. In April 2021, Goncharenko was fired by CSKA and hired by FC Krasnodar, and Vasili followed him as an assistant, with Aleksei staying back at CSKA. On 5 January 2022, Krasnodar fired Goncharenko and Berezutski. On 10 January 2022, he returned to CSKA as an assistant to his brother Aleksei, who was promoted to head coach by that time. On 15 June 2022, he left CSKA by mutual consent, together with his brother.

Career statistics

Club

International goals
Scores and results list Russia's goal tally first, score column indicates score after each Berezutski goal.

Honours

CSKA
Russian Premier League (6): 2003, 2005, 2006, 2012–13, 2013–14, 2015–16
Russian Cup (7): 2001–02, 2004–05, 2005–06, 2007–08, 2008–09, 2010–11, 2012–13
Russian Super Cup: 2004, 2006, 2007, 2009, 2013
UEFA Cup: 2004–05

Russia
UEFA European Football Championship: 2008 bronze medalist

Individual
In the list of 33 best football players of the championship of Russia (9): 2005, 2006, 2007, 2008, 2009, 2010, 2012, 2012–13, 2013–14.

See also
 List of men's footballers with 100 or more international caps

References

External links
 Vasili Berezutski at CSKA Moscow official website
 

1982 births
Living people
Footballers from Moscow
Association football defenders
Russian footballers
Russia under-21 international footballers
Russia international footballers
FC Moscow players
PFC CSKA Moscow players
UEFA Cup winning players
Russian Premier League players
UEFA Euro 2008 players
2014 FIFA World Cup players
UEFA Euro 2016 players
Twin sportspeople
Russian twins
FIFA Century Club
Russian football managers
Russian expatriate football managers
Expatriate football managers in the Netherlands